Ascher: Fabric, Art, Fashion is an illustrated catalog published to accompany an exhibition at the Victoria and Albert Museum, April 15–June 14, 1987, on the textile designs of Zika Ascher and Lida Ascher.

References

Victoria and Albert Museum
Catalogues
1987 in art
Fashion exhibitions